Chamalal may refer to:
The Chamalal people
The Chamalal language
Chaman Lal (novelist)
Chaman Lal Chaman (London-based Punjabi poet)
Chaman Lal Gupta (former minister of state in the Government of India)
Chaman Lal Malhotra (former Indian cricketer)